Skawa is a river in southern Poland, a right tributary of the Vistula. It passes several towns: Jordanów, Maków Podhalański, Sucha Beskidzka, Wadowice and Zator, and whole river is located within the territory of Lesser Poland Voivodeship.  

Since it is a mountain river and causes frequent floodings, its regulation has for years been a priority. Construction of a dam at a village of Świnna Poręba is to be completed by 2014. A reservoir will be created, which will prevent future floods, and which will serve as a source of drinking water for the local population. Skawa flows into the Vistula near the village of Smolice.

Sources

See also
1934 flood in Poland

Rivers of Poland
Rivers of Lesser Poland Voivodeship